The Long Island Association (LIA) is the leading business organization in the Long Island region. The LIA's members are small and large businesses, technology and manufacturing companies, universities, financial service firms, banks, credit unions, hospitals, media companies and sole proprietors, which together employ two thirds of Long Island's workforce. The LIA is the largest and oldest group within the business lobby of Long Island, New York. Four archived New York Times stories from the 1920s preserve the LIA’s early efforts to promote business relocation from New York City. The LIA website’s history section states: Incorporated on July 26, 1926, as the Long Island Chamber of Commerce, the LIA still today takes its mission very seriously: "To support growth, economic development and infrastructure investments on Long Island and to advocate for tax reforms and regulatory relief to improve the local economy and strengthen our business community." The LIA’s own headquarters remained in Manhattan until 1949. It is now based in Melville.

The LIA is a non-profit and non-partisan organization that seeks to make Long Island a better place and business-friendly region. It is the organization looked to both on and off the Island to articulate the region's needs and its future direction. It works closely with organizations throughout the state and the country to positively influence public policy and ensure a prosperous future for the region.

Former presidents included William J. Casey, later CIA Director under President Ronald Reagan and James Lacrocca, former New York State Commissioner of Energy and Transportation. It is now led by Kevin S. Law, who has held several top positions in the public and private sectors.

LIA members enjoy a wide array of benefits-from participation on active committees addressing the major issues facing the region and networking events large and small-to major events that attract former U.S. Presidents and other nationally known respected speakers, as well as a variety of unique publications that provide special insight into Long Island's economy.

External links

Long Island